The Arncliffe Scots are an Australian rugby league football club based in Arncliffe, New South Wales. They compete in the St George Junior Rugby League and Sydney Combined Competition for older grades.  Arncliffe Scots were founded in 1926 and have a rich history.  Arncliffe Scots hold the record for the most senior championships won by a club with 16 championship wins.  The club has also been successful in producing players that have gone on to play in the National Rugby League competition.  So far, the club has produced 29 first grade players who have gone on to play for St. George, four Australian international players and six New South Wales players.  In 2016, the Arncliffe Scots celebrated their 90th season.

Notable juniors
Tiger Black 
Ross Kite
Merv Lees
Johnny King
Pat Jarvis
Bruce Starkey
Ian Herron
Wes Naiqama
Kevin Naiqama
Dean Whare
Yaw Kiti Glymin
George Ndaira
Joseph Leilua
Abbas Miski

See also

List of rugby league clubs in Australia

References

External links

Rugby league teams in Sydney
Rugby clubs established in 1926
1926 establishments in Australia
Arncliffe, New South Wales